The .240 Magnum Rimless Holland & Holland (also known as the .240 Apex and the .240 Super Express) is a centrefire sporting rifle cartridge developed in English gunmakers Holland & Holland no later than 1919, primarily for use in hunting deer and plains game.

As it was common for rimless hunting cartridges, a rimmed (beltless) variant, at the time called just "Holland's 240 Super Express" and now sometimes named .240 Flanged Magnum or .240 H&H Flanged, was developed simultaneously for break-barrel rifles and combination guns.

Overview

When it is loaded at the same pressure as the .243 WSSM using modern powders, the .240 H&H has the potential for slightly better performance.

Most bolt-action rifles made for the .240 H&H will be amply strong enough to handle hand-loaded cartridges at high pressure.

See also
 List of rifle cartridges
 6 mm caliber

References

Pistol and rifle cartridges
Magnum rifle cartridges
British firearm cartridges
Holland & Holland cartridges